Phyllocnistis atractias is a moth of the family Gracillariidae. It is known from New South Wales and Queensland in Australia.

The wingspan is about 4 mm. Adults have a fringe of hairs around the edge of each wing. The fore wings are shiny white with brown wing tips.

References

Phyllocnistis
Endemic fauna of Australia